In particle physics, the electroweak scale, also known as the Fermi scale, is the energy scale around 246 GeV, a typical energy of processes described by the electroweak theory. The particular number 246 GeV is taken to be the vacuum expectation value  of the Higgs field (where  is the Fermi coupling constant). In some cases the term electroweak scale is used to refer to the temperature of electroweak symmetry breaking, 159.5±1.5 GeV
. In other cases, the term is used more loosely to refer to energies in a broad range around 102 - 103 GeV. This is within reach of the Large Hadron Collider (LHC), which is designed for about 104 GeV in proton–proton collisions.

Interactions may have been above this scale during the electroweak epoch.  In the unextended Standard Model, the transition from the electroweak epoch was not a first or a second order phase transition but a continuous crossover, preventing any baryogenesis.  However many extensions to the standard model including supersymmetry and the inert double model have a first order electroweak phase transition (but still lack additional CP violation).

See also
Hierarchy problem
Grand unification scale (1016 GeV)
Planck scale (1019 GeV)

References

Electroweak theory